Laurie Berthon (born 26 August 1991) is a French track cyclist. She represented her nation in four editions of the UCI Track Cycling World Championships (from 2013 to 2016).

Berthon competed for France in the women's omnium at the 2016 Summer Olympics in Rio de Janeiro. There, she collected a total score of 163 points to wrap up the six-race series of the competition in tenth position.

She announced her retirement from the sport in July 2019.

Major results

2008
Grand Prix International Ville de Barcelone 
2nd Keirin
2nd 500m Time Trial
3rd Scratch Race
2012
UEC European U23 Track Championships
2nd Omnium
2nd Scratch Race
2013
UEC European U23 Track Championships
2nd Omnium
2nd Scratch Race
3rd Omnium, Los Angeles Grand Prix
2014
1st Omnium, South East Asian GP Track (1)
1st Points Race, South East Asian GP Track (2)
1st Omnium, South East Asian GP Track (3)
1st Scratch Race, Fenioux Trophy Piste
1st Scratch Race, International Track Women & Men
1st Scratch Race, Track-Cycling Challenge Grenchen
Fenioux - 80 ans du Vélodrome de Lyon
1st Scratch Race
1st Sprint
1st Omnium, Open des Nations sur Piste de Roubaix
2nd Scratch Race, UEC European Track Championships
2nd Scratch Race, Revolution – Round 2, Manchester
2015
1st Omnium, Fenioux Piste International
1st Omnium, Open des Nations sur Piste de Roubaix
1st Omnium, Prova Internacional de Anadia 
2nd Points Race, Revolution - Round 4, Glasgow
3rd Points Race, 6 giorni delle rose - Fiorenzuola 
2016
Trofeu CAR Anadia Portugal
1st Scratch Race
3rd Individual Pursuit
3rd Points Race 
3rd Sprint
3rd 500m Time Trial
2nd Omnium, UCI Track Cycling World Championships
Prova Internacional de Anadia
 2nd Omnium
3rd Scratch race
3rd Elimination race, UEC European Track Championships
Fenioux Piste International
3rd Omnium
3rd Sprint

References

External links
 
 
 

1991 births
French female cyclists
Living people
Cyclists from Lyon
Olympic cyclists of France
Cyclists at the 2016 Summer Olympics
21st-century French women